is a railway station on the Tokyu Ikegami Line in Ota, Tokyo, Japan, operated by Tokyu Corporation.

Lines

Station layout
The station consists of two side platforms serving two tracks.

Platforms

History
On 3 April 1928, it was renamed Ishikawadai.

Surrounding area
 Tokyo Institute of Technology

References

External links

 Ishikawadai Station information (Tokyu) 

Railway stations in Tokyo
Railway stations in Japan opened in 1927
Tokyu Ikegami Line
Stations of Tokyu Corporation